Karnam Malleswari (born 1 June 1975) is a retired Indian weightlifter. She is the first Indian woman to win a medal at the Olympics in 2000. In 1994, she received the Arjuna Award and in 1999, she received the Rajiv Gandhi Khel Ratna award, India's highest sporting honour, and the civilian Padma Shri award.

Career
Malleswari won the world title in the 54 kg division in 1994 and 1995 and placed third in 1993 and 1996. 

In 1994, she won silver at the World Championships in Istanbul and in 1995 she won the Asian Weightlifting Championships in Korea in the 54 kg category. That year, she won the title in China with a record lift of 113 kg at the World Championships. Even before her Olympic win, Malleswari was a two-time weightlifting world champion with 29 international medals, which includes 11 gold medals.

Along with the national and international medals, Malleswari was also awarded with Arjuna Award in 1994, the Rajiv Gandhi Khel Ratna in 1999, and Padma Shri in 1999.

At the 2000 Sydney Olympics, Malleswari lifted 110 kg in the "snatch" and 130 kg in the "clean and jerk" categories for a total of 240 kg. She won the bronze medal and became the first Indian woman to win an Olympic medal. She is also the first Indian weightlifter, male or female, to win an Olympic medal. Her medal was the only medal that India secured in the 2000 Olympics.

Personal life 
Malleswari was born in a Karnam family in Voosavanipeta near Amadalavalasa, a hamlet in Andhra Pradesh. She has four sisters and all are married and well settled in life. 

Malleshwari started her career when she was 12 and was trained under coach Neelamshetty Appanna. Her sister was married and living in Delhi, and Malleshwari moved to that city for better training when it became clear that she had the potential to become a great athlete. Her talent was soon spotted by the Sports Authority of India. In 1990, Malleshwari joined the national camp and four years later, she became the weight-lifting world championship winner in the 54-kg class. 

In 1997, Malleshwari married fellow weightlifter Rajesh Tyagi. In 2001, one year after winning the Olympic bronze medal in her sport, she became a mother with the birth of a son. She planned to return to competitions at the 2002 Commonwealth Games, but withdrew due to her father's death. She retired after failing to score at the 2004 Olympics. Karnam Malleshwari and Tyagi currently lives in Yamunanagar, Haryana, with their son and in-laws in a joint family. She works at the Food Corporation of India as Chief General Manager (General Administration).

In June 2021, she was appointed as the vice-chancellor of Sports University, established by the government of Delhi.

Awards
She is honoured with Arjuna award in 1994 .

References

External links

 
 
 

People from Srikakulam district
1975 births
Living people
Indian female weightlifters
Olympic weightlifters of India
Olympic bronze medalists for India
 Recipients of the Padma Shri in sports
Recipients of the Khel Ratna Award
Telugu people
 Weightlifters at the 2000 Summer Olympics
 Weightlifters at the 2004 Summer Olympics
 People from Srikakulam
 Sportswomen from Andhra Pradesh
 Recipients of the Arjuna Award
 Olympic medalists in weightlifting
 Asian Games medalists in weightlifting
 Weightlifters at the 1994 Asian Games
 Weightlifters at the 1998 Asian Games
 Medalists at the 2000 Summer Olympics
 Asian Games silver medalists for India
20th-century Indian women
21st-century Indian women
 Medalists at the 1998 Asian Games
 People from Uttarandhra
 Sportspeople from Andhra Pradesh
 Weightlifters from Andhra Pradesh
 People from Andhra Pradesh
 Women from Andhra Pradesh